Los Comandos Airport  is an airstrip serving the town of San Francisco Gotera in Morazán Department, El Salvador.

There is rising terrain to the north.

See also

Transport in El Salvador
List of airports in El Salvador

References

External links
 OurAirports - Los Comandos
 OpenStreetMap - Los Comandos
 HERE Maps - Los Comandos
 FallingRain - Los Comandos

Airports in El Salvador